Gabriella Giacobbe (1923–1979) was an Italian stage, film and television actress.

Born in L'Aquila, Giacobbe graduated at the drama school of Giorgio Strehler and worked long with his company at the Piccolo Teatro, debuting in 1953 with the drama La sei giorni. Her stage credits include works directed by Luchino Visconti and Eduardo De Filippo. She also had a prolific career in television, appearing in successful series and TV movies such as A come Andromeda and La donna di picche. More sporadic were her film appearances, which nonetheless included works by Luigi Magni, Dino Risi, Nelo Risi. She died of cancer on 8 January 1979, at the age of 55.

Filmography

References

External links 
 

Italian film actresses
Italian stage actresses
Italian television actresses
People from L'Aquila
1923 births
1979 deaths
Deaths from cancer in Lazio
20th-century Italian actresses